Steven Paul "Buddy" Miller (born September 6, 1952) is an American singer, songwriter, musician, recording artist and producer, currently living in Nashville, Tennessee. Miller is married to and has recorded with singer-songwriter Julie Miller.

Early life and music career 
Buddy was born in Fairborn, Ohio, near Dayton, and his family ended up settling in Princeton, New Jersey. His grandfather gave him the nickname "Buddy."

During the late 1970s he was in a country-rock band called the Desperate Men, which played in the NNJ and New York area, including clubs like Stanhope House, Cuss From Hoe and others. In 1975, he moved to Austin, Texas and played rockabilly music in Ray Campi's band. He auditioned for and played in a band with Julie Griffin (soon to be his second wife).

In 1980, they moved to New York City, and Miller formed the Buddy Miller Band, which included singer-songwriter Shawn Colvin on vocals and guitar. He also performed with Jim Lauderdale and Larry Campbell. Each Sunday, Miller performed in Kinky Friedman's band at the Lone Star Cafe.

Miller moved to Nashville in the 1990s, after a stint in Los Angeles. He worked on recording sessions as a guitar player and vocalist, and began producing his own records in his living room studio named Dogtown.

Recordings 
In 1995, Buddy along with the Sacred Cows recorded a gospel album, Man on the Moon.

His first solo recording, Your Love and Other Lies, was released in 1995. It was followed by Poison Love in 1997 and Cruel Moon in 1999.

He and his wife, Julie Miller, released Buddy & Julie Miller in 2001, which won the Album of the Year Award from the Americana Music Association.

In 2002, he released Midnight and Lonesome and in 2004 he released Universal United House of Prayer.

2009 brought another Buddy and Julie duet album Written in Chalk and in 2011 Buddy collaborated with Bill Frisell, Marc Ribot, and Greg Leisz to release The Majestic Silver Strings.

In 2012, Buddy and Jim Lauderdale released the duet album Buddy & Jim and in 2016, Buddy recorded sessions by Kacey Musgraves, Nikki Lane, Lee Ann Womack, Brandi Carlile, and Kris Kristofferson on the album Cayamo: Sessions at Sea.

Touring and performance 
Miller has toured as lead guitarist and backing vocalist for Emmylou Harris's Spyboy band, Steve Earle on his El Corazon tour, and Emmylou Harris and Linda Ronstadt on their Western Wall tour.

In 2002, Miller toured as part of the Down from the Mountain Tour along with Alison Krauss and Union Station.

In 2004, Miller toured with Emmylou Harris, Patty Griffin, Gillian Welch and David Rawlings as the Sweet Harmony Traveling Revue.

In 2008, Miller toured as part of the band on Robert Plant and Alison Krauss's Raising Sand tour of the U.S. and Europe.

In 2009, Miller joined Emmylou Harris, Patty Griffin and Shawn Colvin on tour as Three Girls and Their Buddy. While on that tour, following a performance in Baltimore on February 19, 2009, Miller suffered a heart attack. He underwent successful triple bypass surgery at Johns Hopkins Hospital on February 20.

In 2010, Miller again joined Robert Plant and Patty Griffin with Plant's Band of Joy, touring the U.S. and Europe.

In 2012, Miller toured with Jim Lauderdale on the Buddy and Jim Tour.

In 2015, Miller was one of the leaders of the house band for Dear Jerry, a tribute concert for Jerry Garcia, which included over 20 acts and took place at Merriweather Post Pavilion.

In 2016, Miller was part of the Lampedusa: Concerts for Refugees tour featuring Patty Griffin, Emmylou Harris, Steve Earle, and the Milk Carton Kids.

For the past decade, Buddy has often been a part of the Cayamo Cruise, which sails from Miami to St. Maarten and Tortola. Each year, prominent Americana musicians are on board, and Buddy often collaborates and records with them.

He is a regular performer at the annual Hardly Strictly Bluegrass music festival in San Francisco where, billed as Buddy Miller's Cavalcade of Stars, he features a changing roster of guest performers.

Recording work for others

Record producer 

Miller has produced albums for artists including Richard Thompson, Shawn Colvin, The Devil Makes Three, Allison Moorer, the Wood Brothers, the Carolina Chocolate Drops, the McCrarys, and Ralph Stanley. He has co-produced records with Robert Plant, Jim Lauderdale and Jimmie Dale Gilmore.

In 2006 Solomon Burke recorded his country album Nashville with Miller. Emmylou Harris, Patty Griffin, Gillian Welch and Dolly Parton appear as duet partners.

Miller produced Patty Griffin's Downtown Church that was released in 2010 and won a Grammy Award for Best Traditional Gospel Album on February 13, 2011.

Miller has produced his own solo albums as well as recordings for and with his wife, singer-songwriter Julie Miller.

Session work 
He co-produced and performed on Jimmie Dale Gilmore's 2000 album One Endless Night. He also played on Lucinda Williams's Car Wheels on a Gravel Road album.

Miller has worked as an instrumentalist or vocalist on records by Johnny Cash, Levon Helm, Lee Ann Womack, Patty Griffin, Emmylou Harris, Victoria Williams, Shawn Colvin, Bobby Bare, Chris Knight, John Fogerty, the Chieftains, Frank Black, Rodney Crowell, Dixie Chicks, Elvis Costello, Alison Krauss and Robert Plant. He has also worked as a recording engineer, mixer or mastering engineer on records by Willie Nelson, Emmylou Harris, Shawn Colvin, Jim Lauderdale, and Patty Griffin.

Songwriting 

Levon Helm, Patty Griffin, Emmylou Harris, Lee Ann Womack, Dixie Chicks, Hank Williams III, Dierks Bentley, Patty Loveless, Tab Benoit and Brooks & Dunn have recorded songs written by Miller.

Film and TV 

Miller signed on as a producer for the ABC TV series Nashville in 2012.  He was the executive music producer for the show in seasons two and three. He also was music producer and musical director for Nashville: On The Record Live Specials.

Along with Don Was, Miller was the musical director for The Life and Songs of Emmylou Harris tribute concert.

Miller was musical director and bandleader for the Americana Music Association's Honors & Awards shows broadcast on AXS TV and PBS.

Buddy has covered Tom T. Hall's song, "That's How I Got to Memphis", which Jeff Daniels sang in the final episode of HBO's The Newsroom in 2014.

Starz political drama Boss used the Plant-Miller produced "Satan, Your Kingdom Must Come Down" as its theme song.

Miller produced the track "Beyond the Blue" featuring Emmylou Harris and Patty Griffin for the 2000 film Where the Heart Is.

In 2015 he appeared on Christina Aguilera's song, "Shotgun", which was written for her appearance on Nashville.<ref name="CA-nodep-2015">{{Cite web |last=Miller |first=Jordan |date=April 21, 2015 |title=Listen: Christina Aguileras Country Ballad "Shotgun" |work=Breathe Heavy |url=http://www.breatheheavy.com/listen-christina-aguileras-country-ballad-shotgun/ |access-date=March 4, 2017}}</ref>

In 2017, Miller contributed his cover of Mark Heard's song "Treasure of the Broken Land" to the tribute album Treasure of the Broken Land: the Songs of Mark Heard.

 Awards, accolades, and other activities 
Between 2002 and 2013, Miller won twelve Americana Music Honors & Awards and was nominated for seven others. Since 2005, he has led the Americana All Star Band, which performs with nominated artists during the Americana Music Honors & Awards ceremonies, held annually at the Ryman Auditorium.

No Depression magazine named him Artist of the Decade in 2008.

 Americana Music Awards 

 Grammy Awards 
Miller is a four-time Grammy nominee, winning once in 2010 for producing Downtown Church by Patty Griffin.

 Radio 
Miller and his longtime friend and collaborator Jim Lauderdale teamed up in 2012 to produce The Buddy & Jim Radio Show'', broadcast on Sirius XM Outlaw Country.

Music gear 
Fender produces a Buddy Miller signature acoustic guitar.

Buddy frequently uses vintage Wandré electric guitars and TEO mando-guitars.

In his studio, Buddy uses a pair of Swart amplifiers: Atomic Space Tones and Atomic Space Tone Pros, and two tremolos panned in stereo at conflicting settings. Onstage, he often uses a Swart Atomic Space Tones amplifier and a Fulltone Supa-Trem2 pedal.

He mostly records using Pro Tools, but in his recording studio Buddy treasures a 1970s Trident B Range 28×24 analog recording console that previously belonged to Mark Heard.

Compositions

Discography

References

External links 

 
 
 

American country singer-songwriters
American country guitarists
American male guitarists
American male singer-songwriters
American audio engineers
1952 births
Living people
People from Nashville, Tennessee
People from Fairborn, Ohio
New West Records artists
Record producers from Tennessee
Record producers from Ohio
Singer-songwriters from Tennessee
Singer-songwriters from Ohio
Guitarists from Tennessee
Engineers from Ohio
Engineers from Tennessee
20th-century American guitarists
Band of Joy members
Guitarists from Ohio
Country musicians from Tennessee
Country musicians from Ohio
20th-century American male musicians